Donald Johnson and Jared Palmer were the defending champions but lost in the second round to Guillermo Cañas and David Nalbandian.

Michael Hill and Daniel Vacek won in the final 6–4, 6–4 against Lucas Arnold and Gastón Etlis.

Seeds
Champion seeds are indicated in bold text while text in italics indicates the round in which those seeds were eliminated. The top four seeded teams received byes into the second round.

Draw

Final

Top half

Bottom half

External links
 2002 Open SEAT Godó Doubles Draw

2002 Torneo Godó
Doubles